Las aventuras de Pito Pérez ("The Adventures of Pito Pérez") is a 1957 Mexican film directed by Juan Bustillo Oro and produced by Fernando de Fuentes, and starring Germán Valdés. It is based on the 1938 novel La vida inútil de Pito Pérez by José Rubén Romero.

In 2012, in the 60th anniversary of José Rubén Romero's death, the film was shown in the Manuel M. Ponce Hall of the Palacio de Bellas Artes in Mexico City.

Plot
After a long absence, Pito Pérez (Germán Valdés), a homeless man, returns to his village and recounts all his adventures.

Cast
Germán Valdés as Jesús Pérez Gaona "Pito Pérez" (as Tin Tan)
Anabelle Gutiérrez as Chucha (as Anabel Gutierrez)
Andrés Soler as Señor del Rincón
Consuelo Guerrero de Luna as Doña Jovita
Eduardo Alcaraz as Padre Pureco
Marcelo Chávez as Don J. de J. Jiménez, apothecary (as Marcelo)
Óscar Ortiz de Pinedo as Don Santiago Bolaños
Lupe Inclán as Pelagia, nurse
Guillermo Bravo Sosa as Gayosso's patient
José Jasso as Dr. Gayosso
Rafael Estrada as Don Pepe
José Ortega as Don Goyo, barman
Ramón Valdés as Truck Driver
Amalia Gama as Doña Refugito
Stephen Berne as Prisoner (uncredited)
Carlos Bravo y Fernández as Gayosso's patient (uncredited)
Lupe Carriles as Doña Huicha (uncredited)
José Chávez as Don Ruperto (uncredited)
Enedina Díaz de León as Angry bakery client (uncredited)
Paquito Fernández as Boy who buys liquor (uncredited)
Conchita Gentil Arcos as Spectator of false missionary  (uncredited)
Leonor Gómez as Tortilla seller (uncredited)
Elodia Hernández as Doña Cholita (uncredited)
Guillermo Hernández as Anticlerical prisoner (uncredited)
Vicente Lara as Prisoner (uncredited)
Ramón G. Larrea as Don Lino, baker (uncredited)
Blanca Marroquín as Apothecary client (uncredited)
José Muñoz as Religious prisoner (uncredited)
Pepe Nava as Policeman (uncredited)
José Pardavé as Gayosso's patient (uncredited)
Ignacio Peón as Porter (uncredited)
Alicia Reyna as Drink seller (uncredited)
Humberto Rodríguez as Friend of don Pepe (uncredited)
Aurora Ruiz as Doña Catita (uncredited)
Ramón Sánchez as Prisoner (uncredited)
Hernán Vera as Don Tacho (uncredited)

References

Bibliography
Dann Luna, Ilana. Adapting Gender: Mexican Feminisms from Literature to Film. SUNY Press, 2018.

External links
 

1957 comedy-drama films
Mexican comedy-drama films
Films directed by Juan Bustillo Oro
1957 comedy films
1957 drama films
1957 films
Mexican black-and-white films
1950s Mexican films